San Mariano, officially the Municipality of San Mariano (Ibanag: Ili nat San Mariano;), is a 1st class municipality in the province of Isabela, Philippines. According to the 2020 census, it has a population of 60,124 people.

It is also a suburb of neighboring Ilagan, the provincial capital.

It constitutes 13.78 percent of the total land area of the province, and is the province's largest and the country's third largest municipality.

The municipality lies in the eastern part of the province of Isabela. It is bounded on the north by the Ilagan, on the east by Palanan, on the south by San Guillermo and on the west by Benito Soliven.

Today, San Mariano is continuously being developed, road constructions and other infrastructure project is already being implemented.

History
Legend has it that San Mariano was once a barrio of Ilagan, the capital city of the province of Isabela. It was first named as Angela in reference to Mariano Kalingog whose family was one of the foremost settlers of the place. Angela was drowned while she was washing clothes along the Pinacanauan River. The incident brought grief to the people and her husband Mariano who also died some years later. Since then, this village teeming with fish and lush trees was known as San Mariano.
 
In 1920, by virtue of Executive Order 25, San Mariano became a Municipal District and with the passage of Philippines Legislature Act No. 3416 dated December 7, 1927, it was made a distinct and regular municipality.

After some years, there was an influx of migrants coming from the provinces of Ilocos, Cagayan and Pangasinan. These new settlers formed communities in tracks of agricultural lands on which they grew corn and other crops such as rice, root crops, different kinds of vegetables and bananas.

Cultural history
Records also show that when a German naturalist named Carl Semper hiked the Sierra Madre mountains in May 1860, he observed early inhabitants who are known today as the Kalingas. He described the said group as a typical Filipino “cultural minority” who grew their own food, practiced their own religious rites, smithed their own tools, decorated their own artifacts with distinctive designs and traded forest products for metal and salt.

On the pacific side of the mountains, Semper saw the “Negritos” and concluded that they were new arrivals because he observed no “Kalinga-Negrito” mestizos among them. They inhabited the forest close to the “Kalinga” settlements and showed up with games in seasonal periods to barter for agricultural products. Years later, some sociologists noted that there were inter-marriages entered into between these tribes.

These natives, however, were out-numbered by the mestizos or the “Ibanag-Kalinga,” the pure Ibanags and Ilocanos with a ratio of about four to one. These settlers tilled permanent farms at a place which is now known as Barangays Disulap and Minanga.

There was also an influx of several groups from the Bicol and Tagalog regions during the logging concession boom. The continuing acculturation of these groups brought about social changes in the locality. The once verdant forest slowly became barren and denuded with the ceaseless illegal logging and kaingin system employed by the local people and new migrants. When the national government decided to impose a total log ban, the ethnic groups decided to settle in the remote areas of the municipality to farm their lands. The Bicolanos and Tagalogs, on the other hand, went back to their own regions.

Geography

Barangays
San Mariano is politically subdivided into 36 barangays. These barangays are headed by elected officials: Barangay Captain, Barangay Council, whose members are called Barangay Councilors. All are elected every three years.

Climate

Existing general and urban land uses
Of the total land area of the municipality, built-up area constitutes 1,268 hectares or 0.86 percent with the Poblacion as the largest and most densely populated built-up area. Open grasslands occupy a total area of approximately 20,700 hectares representing about 14.09 percent. Generally, the open grasslands are flanked by either agricultural areas or forest areas. Vast forest areas of the municipality are mostly found at its eastern portion, which covers about 53.39 percent or an approximated area of 78,450.50 hectares. About 29,264 hectares or 19.91 percent are presently devoted to extensive agricultural activities with corn, rice and bananas as the major crops. Water bodies, including banks, buffer or salvage zones occupy an estimated 11.58 percent while existing roads and streets cover 2.17 percent of the municipality's total area.

Demographics

Economy

Government

Local government
The municipality is governed by a mayor designated as its local chief executive and by a municipal council as its legislative body in accordance with the Local Government Code. The mayor, vice mayor, and the councilors are elected directly by the people through an election which is being held every three years.

Elected officials

Congress representation
San Mariano, belonging to the second legislative district of the province of Isabela, currently represented by Hon. Ed Christopher S. Go.

List of former chief executives

Education
The Schools Division of Isabela governs the town's public education system. The division office is a field office of the DepEd in Cagayan Valley region. The office governs the public and private elementary and public and private high schools throughout the municipality.

References

External links
 Municipal Profile at the National Competitiveness Council of the Philippines
 San Mariano at the Isabela Government Website
 Local Governance Performance Management System
 [ Philippine Standard Geographic Code]
 Philippine Census Information
 Municipality of San Mariano 
 San Mariano Website

Municipalities of Isabela (province)